Severo Efraín Meza Mayorga (born 9 July 1986) is a Mexican former professional footballer who played as a defender.

He gave an assist for the winning goal to Guillermo Franco and thus winning the semi-final and Clásico Regiomontano against Tigres UANL during the Apertura 2005 tournament.

Meza was assaulted during a robbery at his home in February 2012.

Honours
Monterrey
Mexican Primera División: Apertura 2009, Apertura 2010
CONCACAF Champions League: 2010-11, 2011–12, 2012–13
InterLiga: 2010

References

External links
 
 

1986 births
Living people
Mexican footballers
Mexico international footballers
C.F. Monterrey players
Dorados de Sinaloa footballers
Club Necaxa footballers
Liga MX players
2013 FIFA Confederations Cup players
Footballers from Veracruz
Association football defenders